The Washington Hilton is a hotel in Washington, D.C. It is located at 1919 Connecticut Avenue, N.W., roughly at the boundaries of the Kalorama, Dupont Circle, and Adams Morgan neighborhoods.

The Washington Hilton, located on the former site of the Oak Lawn estate, was designed by architect William B. Tabler and developed by Uris Buildings Corporation. A groundbreaking ceremony was held on June 25, 1962 and the hotel officially opened three years later, on March 25, 1965. The hotel structure features a distinctive double-arched design. It long sported the largest pillar-less hotel ballroom in the city. Numerous large events have been regularly hosted at the Hilton Washington, including the annual dinners of the White House Correspondents Association and the Radio and Television Correspondents Association, as well as the National Prayer Breakfast.

During the 1960s and 1970s, the hotel hosted a number of big musical acts for concerts in their large ballroom, including The Doors and Jimi Hendrix. In 1972 it was home to the first International Conference on Computer Communications which demonstrated new ARPANET technology.

The hotel was the site of the assassination attempt on President Ronald Reagan by John Hinckley Jr. on March 30, 1981.  The attempt occurred at the hotel's T Street NW exit. As a result, the hotel is sometimes colloquially referred to by locals as the "Hinckley Hilton".

The hotel was renamed the Hilton Washington in 1998. It was purchased in June 2007 by an investment firm jointly owned by former professional basketball star Magic Johnson. From 2009-2010 it underwent a $150 million renovation. When that was completed, the hotel returned to its original name.

References

External links

 Official site
 Ladies and Gentlement, From Los Angeles, California ... The Doors! - 1967 Doors concert at Washington Hilton
 Hendrix Plays the Washington Hilton (1968) - 1968 Jimi Hendrix concert at the Washington Hilton and review from the Washington Post

Hotel buildings completed in 1965
Brutalist architecture in Washington, D.C.
Washington
Skyscraper hotels in Washington, D.C.
Hotels established in 1965
Dupont Circle
Adams Morgan
Attempted assassination of Ronald Reagan
1965 establishments in Washington, D.C.